Hannes Leitgeb (born June 26, 1972, Salzburg) is an Austrian philosopher and mathematician. He is Professor of Philosophy at the Ludwig Maximilian University of Munich and has received a Humboldt Professorship in 2010. His areas of research include logic (theories of truth and modality, paradox, conditionals, nonmonotonic reasoning, dynamic doxastic logic), epistemology (belief, inference, belief revision, foundations of probability, Bayesianism), philosophy of mathematics (structuralism, informal provability, abstraction, criteria of identity), philosophy of language (indeterminacy of translation, compositionality), cognitive science (symbolic representation and neural networks, metacognition), philosophy of science (empirical content, measurement theory), and history of philosophy (logical positivism, Carnap, Quine).

Leitgeb studied mathematics at the University of Salzburg and graduated with a Master's degree in 1997. After his PhDs in mathematics (1998) and philosophy (2001), also in Salzburg, he was offered a position as assistance professor at the university's faculty of philosophy. In 2003 he received an Erwin Schrödinger scholarship by the Austrian Science Fund to do research at the Stanford University Department of Philosophy/CSLI. From 2005 on, he worked at the Departments of Philosophy and Mathematics in Bristol. Two years later, he became Professor of Mathematical Logic and Philosophy of Mathematics. 

In autumn 2010, he followed an invitation to the Chair of Logic and Philosophy of Language at the Ludwig Maximilian University of Munich, where he became director of the Munich Center for Mathematical Philosophy.

In 2016 he became a member of the German Academy of Sciences Leopoldina.

References

21st-century Austrian philosophers
Living people
Philosophers of science
German logicians
German philosophers
1972 births
German male writers
Members of the German Academy of Sciences Leopoldina